The 1919 U.S. National Championships (now known as the US Open) was a tennis tournament that took place on the outdoor grass courts at the West Side Tennis Club, Forest Hills in New York City, United States. The women's tournament was held from 16 June until 20 June while the men's tournament ran from 26 August until 4 September. It was the 39th staging of the U.S. National Championships and the second Grand Slam tennis event of the year.

Champions

Men's singles

 Bill Johnston defeated  Bill Tilden  6–4, 6–4, 6–3

Women's singles

 Hazel Hotchkiss Wightman defeated  Marion Zinderstein  6–1, 6–2

Men's doubles
 Norman Brookes /  Gerald Patterson defeated  Bill Tilden /  Vincent Richards 8–6, 6–3, 4–6, 4–6, 6–2

Women's doubles
 Marion Zinderstein /  Eleanor Goss defeated  Eleonora Sears /  Hazel Wightman 10–8, 9–7

Mixed doubles
 Marion Zinderstein /  Vincent Richards defeated  Florence Ballin /  Bill Tilden 2–6, 11–9, 6–2

References

External links
Official US Open website

 
U.S. National Championships
U.S. National Championships (tennis) by year
U.S. National Championships (tennis)
U.S. National Championships (tennis)
U.S. National Championships (tennis)
U.S. National Championships (tennis)
U.S. National Championships (tennis)